The Apalachicola River  is a river, approximately  long, in the state of Florida. The river's large watershed, known as the Apalachicola, Chattahoochee and Flint (ACF) River Basin, drains an area of approximately  into the Gulf of Mexico. Its name comes from Apalachicola Province, an association of Native American towns located on what is now the Chattahoochee River. The Spanish included what is now called the Chattahoochee River as part of one river, calling all of it from its origins in the southern Appalachian foothills down to the Gulf of Mexico the Apalachicola.

Description
The actual confluence is contained within the Lake Seminole reservoir formed by the Jim Woodruff Dam. It flows generally south through the forests of the Florida Panhandle, past Bristol. In northern Gulf County, it receives the Chipola River from the west. It flows into Apalachicola Bay, an inlet of the Gulf of Mexico, at Apalachicola, Florida. The lower  of the river is surrounded by extensive swamps and wetlands, except at the coast.

The watershed contains nationally significant forests, with some of the highest biological diversity east of the Mississippi River and rivaling that of the Great Smoky Mountains. It has significant areas of temperate deciduous forest as well as longleaf pine landscapes and flatwoods. Flooded areas have significant tracts of floodplain forest. All of these southeastern forest types were devastated by logging between 1880 and 1920, and the Apalachicola contains some of the finest remaining examples of old growth forest in the southeast. The endangered tree species Florida torreya is endemic to the region; it clings to forested slopes and bluffs in Torreya State Park along the east bank of the river.

Where the river enters the Gulf of Mexico, it creates a rich array of wetlands varying in salinity. These include tidal marshes and seagrass meadows. Over  of this diverse delta complex are included within the Apalachicola National Estuarine Research Reserve. There are also dunes with coastal grasslands and interdunal swales.

The basin of the Apalachicola River is also noted for its Tupelo honey, a high-quality monofloral honey, which is produced wherever the tupelo trees bloom in the southeastern United States. In a good harvest year, the value of the tupelo honey crop produced by a group of specialized Florida beekeepers approaches $900,000 each spring.

During Florida's British colonial period, the river formed the boundary between East Florida and West Florida. Geologically, the river links the coastal plain and Gulf Coast with the Appalachian Mountains.

Some of the remaining important areas of natural habitat along the river include Apalachicola National Forest, Torreya State Park, The Nature Conservancy Apalachicola Bluffs and Ravines Preserve, Tates Hell State Forest, and Apalachicola River Wildlife and Environmental Area, as well as the Apalachicola River Water Management Area. It has been suggested that this watershed should be nationally ranked and appreciated as being as significant as the Everglades or Great Smoky Mountains. To raise awareness about the importance of preserving the natural state of the river and its inhabitants, Florida film producer Elam Stoltzfus highlighted this system in a 2006 documentary broadcast on PBS.

The river forms the boundary between the Eastern and Central time zones in Florida, until it reaches the Jackson River.  Thereafter, the Jackson River, which flows to the Gulf of Mexico, is the time zone boundary.

List of crossings

See also
List of Florida rivers
South Atlantic-Gulf Water Resource Region
Voices of the Apalachicola
Water wars in Florida

References

Further reading
Boyce, S.G., and W.M. Martin. 1993. The future of the terrestrial communities of the southeastern United States. Pp. 339–366, In W.H. Martin, S.G. Boyce, and A.C. Echternacht (Eds.). Biodiversity of the Southeastern United States, Lowland Terrestrial Communities. Wiley, New York, NY.
Light, H.M., M.R. Darst, and J.W. Grubbs. (1998). Aquatic habitats in relation to river flow in the Apalachicola River floodplain, Florida [U.S. Geological Survey Professional Paper 1594]. Washington, D.C.: U.S. Department of the Interior, U.S. Geological Survey.

External links

National Estuarine Research Reserve
Flint-Chatahoochee-Apalachicola basin , US Army Corps of Engineers
Apalachicola River Ecological Management Plan (archived), Florida State University
Apalachicola River Watershed (archived), protectingourwater.org
Apalachicola River Wildlife and Environmental Area at myfwc.com
Apalachicola Riverkeeper, an organization focused on the protection of the Apalachicola
Apalachicola Bluffs and Ravines Preserve at nature.org
Northwest Florida Water Management District (archived)

 

Drainage basins of the Gulf of Mexico
Outstanding Florida Waters
Rivers of Florida
Apalachicola National Forest
Bodies of water of Gulf County, Florida
Bodies of water of Gadsden County, Florida
Bodies of water of Jackson County, Florida
Bodies of water of Liberty County, Florida
Rivers of Franklin County, Florida